Richard Stuart Peckover FInstP, FIMA, FRMetS, FRAS, FSaRS (5 May 1942 – 15 August 2005) was Chief Safety Adviser to the UK Atomic Energy Authority, 2000–2002.

Peckover married Carole Jordan in 1971; they divorced in 1983. In 1996, he married again to Elizabeth Griffiths (née Richardson).

References

1942 births
2005 deaths
British nuclear physicists
Fellows of the Institute of Physics
Fellows of the Royal Astronomical Society
Fellows of the Institute of Mathematics and its Applications